The Group Stage was the first stage of the 2018 Women's Softball World Championship. Qualified teams were split into 2 groups of 8 teams each following a serpentine system based on the Women's Softball WBSC World Rankings. Teams played a round-robin within their group, the top 4 teams in each group advanced to the playoff round and the bottom 4 sent to the placement round. It was the last time the groups would compete at the same time and location as each other or the final stages.

Group A

Standings

Boxscores

Day 2

Day 3

Day 4

Day 5

Day 6

Day 7

Day 8

Group B

Standings

Boxscores

Day 1

Day 2

Day 3

Day 4

Day 5

Day 6

Day 7

Day 8

References

External links
Official Website

Womens Softball World Championship
Women's Softball World Championship
Womens Softball World Championship
2018
Softball World Championship